Mountain Meadows Reservoir is an artificial lake, located in Lassen County, California.  The lake is also known as Walker Lake.  Its waters are impounded by the Indian Ole Dam, which was completed in 1924.

Hydrology
The lake is fed by Robbers Creek, Goodrich Creek, Duffy Creek, Cottonwood Creek, Mountain Meadows Creek, Greenville Creek, and Deerheart Creek.  It discharges into Hamilton Creek, which feeds Lake Almanor.

Indian Ole Dam
Pacific Gas and Electric Company owns the dam and manages the surrounding lands.

History
Cultural remnants of both the American pioneers and the Maidu exist near the reservoir and other sites are believed to exist beneath its waters.

As of September 13, 2015, the reservoir was completely dry, resulting in the death of perhaps thousands of fish.

Recreation
Recreational uses of the lake include duck hunting, bird watching, fishing, and ice-skating. Near the dam there is a boat ramp, which is accessible by way of a County-maintained gravel road.

See also
 List of dams and reservoirs in California
 List of lakes in California
 Moonlight Fire

References

External links
Mountain Meadows Conservancy
PaddlingCalifornia.com
photos

Reservoirs in Lassen County, California
Reservoirs in California
Reservoirs in Northern California